Dubrovka is a rural locality (a village) in Ibrayevsky Selsoviet, Aurgazinsky District, Bashkortostan, Russia. The population was 150 as of 2010. There is 1 street.

Geography 
Dubrovka is located 26 km northeast of Tolbazy (the district's administrative centre) by road. Novofyodorovka is the nearest rural locality.

References 

Rural localities in Aurgazinsky District